Senator Perry may refer to:

Benjamin Franklin Perry (1805–1886), South Carolina State Senate
Carleton Perry (1931–2017), Wyoming State Senate
Charles D. Perry (1907–1964), New York State Senate
Charles Perry (Texas politician) (born 1962), Texas State Senate
Gary Perry (fl. 2000s–2010s), Montana State Senate
Jim Perry (politician) (born 1970s), North Carolina State Senate
Joe Perry (politician) (fl. 1980s–2010s), Maine State Senate
John C. Perry (1832–1884), New York State Senate
John D. Perry (born 1935), New York State Senate
John J. Perry (1811–1897), Maine State Senate
John R. Perry (judge) (born 1954), Wyoming State Senate
Jonathan Perry (politician) (born 1973), Louisiana State Senate
Keith Perry (politician) (born 1958), Florida State Senate
M. W. Perry (1864–1951), Wisconsin State Senate
Rhoda Perry (born 1943), Rhode Island State Senate
Ruth Perry (1939–2017), Liberian Senate
Theodore Perry (1833–1921), Iowa State Senate
William H. Perry (South Carolina politician) (1839–1902), South Carolina State Senate

See also
Mike Parry (politician) (born 1953), Minnesota State Senate